Letters from War is a 2016 Portuguese drama film directed by Ivo M. Ferreira and based on the epistolary novel D'este viver aqui neste papel descripto by António Lobo Antunes. It was selected to compete for the Golden Bear at the 66th Berlin International Film Festival, where it had its world premiere. It was selected as the Portuguese entry for the Best Foreign Language Film at the 89th Academy Awards but it was not nominated.

Cast
 Miguel Nunes as António
 Margarida Vila-Nova as Maria José
 Ricardo Pereira
 João Pedro Vaz
 João Pedro Mamede
 Simão Cayatte
 Isac Graça
 Gonçalo Carvalho
 Francisco Hestnes

See also
 List of submissions to the 89th Academy Awards for Best Foreign Language Film
 List of Portuguese submissions for the Academy Award for Best Foreign Language Film

References

External links
 

2016 films
2016 drama films
Portuguese drama films
Portuguese black-and-white films
2010s Portuguese-language films
Films based on Portuguese novels
Golden Globes (Portugal) winners
Sophia Award winners